James William Thompson (19 April 1898 – August 1984) was a professional footballer, football manager and football scout.

Career
Thompson, a striker, began his career as an amateur with Charlton and Wimbledon before playing for Millwall, Coventry City, Clapton Orient, Luton Town, Chelsea, Norwich City, Sunderland, Fulham and Hull City. He then moved into Non-League football with Tunbridge Wells Rangers and Peterborough United, he then signed for Tranmere Rovers, Sittingbourne and Aldershot before retiring. He managed Dartford and later worked as a scout at Chelsea and Southampton and is credited with having discovered Jimmy Greaves.

In his career, he played 150 professional games, scoring 97 goals. 30 of those appearances and 17 of the goals were for Norwich.

Notes

References

1898 births
1984 deaths
English footballers
Custom House F.C. players
Charlton Athletic F.C. players
Wimbledon F.C. players
Millwall F.C. players
Coventry City F.C. players
Leyton Orient F.C. players
Luton Town F.C. players
Chelsea F.C. players
Norwich City F.C. players
Sunderland A.F.C. players
Fulham F.C. players
Hull City A.F.C. players
Tunbridge Wells F.C. players
Tranmere Rovers F.C. players
Sittingbourne F.C. players
Peterborough United F.C. players
Linfield F.C. players
Aldershot F.C. players
FC Luzern players
Dartford F.C. managers
Chelsea F.C. non-playing staff
Southampton F.C. non-playing staff
Association football forwards
English football managers